Disphragis sobolis is a moth of the family Notodontidae first described by James S. Miller in 2011. It is found on the eastern slopes of the Andes from Bolivia to Villavicencio in Colombia. The range includes north-eastern Ecuador.

The length of the forewings is 18.5–23 mm. The ground colour of the forewings is reddish brown mixed with light brown. The ground colour of the hindwings is light chocolate brown.

Etymology
The specific name is derived from Latin soboles (meaning a shoot or twig) and refers to the distal process of the aedeagus, a feature not found in related species such as Disphragis notabilis and Disphragis normula (if considered a valid species).

References

Moths described in 2011
Notodontidae